Alexander van Gaelen (1670-1728), who was born at Amsterdam, was the scholar of Jan van Huchtenburgh, and, like his master, painted battles and subjects of the chase, which he treated with great fire and spirit. Whilst he was a pupil of Huchtenburgh, he had an opportunity of improving his touch by copying the works of Wouwerman, Berchem, and other eminent masters, as his instructor was a dealer in pictures as well as a painter; and he was perhaps more indebted to this circumstance, than to the lessons of Huchtenburgh. He soon found himself able to dispense with further instruction, and, resolving on visiting other countries in search of improvement, went to Germany, where he passed some time at Cologne, in the employment of the Elector. After a few years passed in Germany he returned to Holland, where, not meeting with the encouragement he expected, he did not long remain, but determined to visit England, whither some of his pictures had preceded him. He accordingly came to this country in the reign of Queen Anne, and is said to have painted a picture of Her Majesty in a coach drawn by eight horses, and attended by several of the nobility. He also painted three pictures, representing two of the principal battles between the Royal Army and that of the Commonwealth in the time of Charles I, and the Battle of the Boyne. No mention, however, is made of Van Gaelen in Walpole's Anecdotes. He died in 1728.

References
 

1670 births
1728 deaths
18th-century Dutch painters
18th-century Dutch male artists
Dutch male painters
Painters from Amsterdam